Chris Lambert may refer to:

Chris Lambert (sprinter) (born 1981), English professional sprinter
Chris Lambert (baseball) (born 1983), American Major League baseball pitcher
Chris Lambert (footballer) (1921–2005), Australian rules footballer
Chris Lambert (racing driver) (died 1968), British racing driver, killed in a Formula Two race at Circuit Park Zandvoort
Chris Lambert (musician), American singer-songwriter and musician

See also
Christopher Lambert (disambiguation)